Fantastic Plastic Machine can mean one of four things:

 Fantastic Plastic Machine (musician), the stage name of Japanese musician Tomoyuki Tanaka
 The Fantastic Plastic Machine (album), the 1997 debut album of the above artist
 The Fantastic Plastic Machine, the 1969 documentary film about surfing
 The Fantastic Plastic Machine (soundtrack), the soundtrack to the film, composed by Harry Betts